Gostinari is a commune located in Giurgiu County, Muntenia, Romania. It is composed of two villages, Gostinari and Mironești.

References

External links

Communes in Giurgiu County
Localities in Muntenia